Washington State Ferries (WSF) is a government agency that operates automobile and passenger ferry service in the U.S. state of Washington as part of the Washington State Department of Transportation. It runs ten routes serving 20 terminals located around Puget Sound and in the San Juan Islands, designated as part of the state highway system. The agency maintains the largest fleet of ferries in the United States at 21 vessels. , it was the largest ferry operator in the United States and the second-largest vehicular ferry system in the world.

History 
The ferry system has its origins in the "mosquito fleet", a collection of small steamer lines serving the Puget Sound area during the later part of the nineteenth century and early part of the 20th century. By the beginning of the 1930s, two lines remained: the Puget Sound Navigation Company (known as the Black Ball Line) and the Kitsap County Transportation Company. A strike in 1935 caused the KCTC to close, leaving only the Black Ball Line.

Toward the end of the 1940s, the Black Ball Line wanted to increase its fares, to compensate for increased wage demands from the ferry workers' unions, but the state refused to allow this, and so the Black Ball Line shut down. In 1951, the state bought nearly all of Black Ball's ferry assets for $5 million (Black Ball retained five vessels of its fleet). The state intended to run ferry service only until cross-sound bridges could be built, but these were never approved, and the Washington State Department of Transportation runs the system to this day.

During the COVID-19 pandemic, WSF reduced service on most routes and suspended trips to Sidney on the Anacortes–San Juan Islands route. The loss of workers who retired, transferred, or were fired during the pandemic caused delays and trip cancellations as service and ridership began to recover in 2021 and 2022, while vessel replacement also ran behind schedule. By early 2023, full levels of service were restored on four routes but remained limited across much of the system; the Sidney route is not expected to re-enter service until 2030.

Routes

Former routes 

Agate Pass, replaced by the Agate Pass Bridge on October 7, 1950
Edmonds–Port Ludlow
Port Gamble–Shine, replaced by South Point route on June 10, 1950
Seattle–Suquamish, discontinued on October 1, 1951
South Point–Lofall, replaced by Hood Canal Bridge in 1961
Tacoma Narrows, replaced by Tacoma Narrows Bridge in 1940 but reinstated from 1940 to 1950

Fleet 

, there are 21 ferries on Puget Sound operated by the state. The largest vessels in this fleet carry up to 2500 passengers and 202 vehicles. They are painted in a distinctive white and green trim paint scheme, and feature double-ended open vehicle decks and bridges at each end so that they do not need to turn around.

WSF plans to electrify its fleet over 20 years. By 2024, it intends to build 16 new hybrid-electric vessels and convert six others to have hybrid propulsion. This will reduce carbon emissions by up 180,000 tons annually and save $19 million per year in diesel fuel costs.

The ferry fleet consists of the following vessels:

Retired vessels 

Since the beginning of state-run ferry service in 1951, WSF has retired many vessels as they have become older, too expensive to operate or maintain, or have become too small to provide adequate ferry service. WSF owned passenger-only vessels between 1985 and 2009, but after discontinuing its two passenger-only routes in the 2000s, WSF has sold its passenger-only ferries to other operators.

Below is a list of ferries that WSF has retired since 1951. Unless otherwise noted, all vessels introduced in 1951 were acquired from the Puget Sound Navigation Company (PSN), also known as the Black Ball Line, when the state took over the company's routes and ferryboats in Puget Sound.

Other ferries 

There are several other publicly operated, private, and passenger-only ferries in Washington state.

See also 

Alaska Marine Highway
BC Ferries
Black Ball Line
Ferries in Washington State
Inter-Island Ferry Authority
Keller Ferry
King County Water Taxi
Kitsap Fast Ferries
Seattle tugboats

References

External links 

Evergreenfleet.com – A History of Washington State Ferries Past and Present
Vehicle Reservation Predesign Study

 
Sound Transit
Ferries of Washington (state)
Ferry companies based in Washington (state)